Ivan Dobrev is a Bulgarian Slavicist. He is one of the founders of the Department of Cyrillo-Methodian Studies at Sofia University.

In 1962 he graduated Bulgarian Philology at Sofia University and for 46 years taught in it, as well as at other Bulgarian universities, the subjects of Old Bulgarian language and history in Bulgarian. He has specialized in Moscow and St. Petersburg. He has been a member of Bulgarian Academy of Sciences since 1996.

He is the author of more than 100 articles and studies.

Sources 

Corresponding Members of the Bulgarian Academy of Sciences
Slavists
Linguists from Bulgaria
Indo-Europeanists
Linguists of Indo-European languages
Sofia University alumni
Academic staff of Sofia University
Cyrillo-Methodian studies
1938 births
Living people